William Phelan (16 July 1915 – 22 December 1973) was an Australian politician.

He was born in Maryborough to ironmonger Sydney Clifford Phelan and Letitia Ellen Chellew. He attended the local high school and on 22 October 1938 married Hazel Patten, with whom he had four children. He worked in the family firm and in 1939 succeeded his father as managing director. He expanded the firm until in 1950 it was the largest in Maryborough. From 1944 to 1961 he served on Maryborough Council, with a term as mayor from 1954 to 1955. In 1964 he was elected to the Victorian Legislative Assembly as the Country Party member for Kara Kara. He served until his defeat in 1970. Phelan died at Maryborough in 1973.

References

1915 births
1973 deaths
National Party of Australia members of the Parliament of Victoria
Members of the Victorian Legislative Assembly
20th-century Australian politicians